Gymnancyla canella is a species of moth of the family Pyralidae. It is found in most of Europe, except Ireland, the Baltic region and Fennoscandia.

The wingspan is 22–25 mm. Adults are on wing from June to August.
The larvae feed on Salsola kali and sometimes Atriplex species. Young larvae feed internally in the stems or shoots. Later, they feed externally from a silken web containing trapped grains of sand.

References

Moths described in 1775
Phycitini
Moths of Europe